Ocrisiodes antiopa is a species of snout moth in the genus Ocrisiodes. It was described by Roesler in 1988, and is known from Iran.

References

Moths described in 1988
Phycitinae